Triigi is a village in Saaremaa Parish, Saare County in western Estonia.

Before the administrative reform in 2017, the village was in Leisi Parish.

A ferry service operates from Triigi harbour to Sõru on the island of Hiiumaa.

References

Villages in Saare County